The women's individual pursuit at the 2006 Dutch National Track Championships in Alkmaar took place at Sportpaleis Alkmaar from December 29 to December 30, 2006.

Vera Koedooder won the gold medal, Marlijn Binnendijk took silver and Ellen van Dijk won the bronze.

Competition format
The tournament started with a qualifying round on December 29. The two fastest qualifiers advanced to the gold medal final on December 30. The numbers three and four competed against each other for the bronze medal, also on December 30.

Results

Qualification (top 4)
The qualification round took place in the afternoon of December 29.

Results from verakoedooder.nl.

Finals
The finals took place in the morning of December 30.
Bronze medal match

Gold medal match

Results from nos.nl

Final results (top 4)

Results from nos.nl

References

2006 Dutch National track cycling championships
Dutch National Track Championships – Women's individual pursuit
Dutch